There are over 9,000 Grade I listed buildings in England. This page is a list of these buildings in the district of Torridge in Devon.

Torridge

|}

See also
 Grade II* listed buildings in Torridge

Notes

External links

Lists of Grade I listed buildings in Devon
Grade I listed buildings in Devon
Grade I